is a private junior college in Tondabayashi, Osaka Prefecture, Japan. It was established in 1950 and became coeducational in 2006.

See also 
 List of junior colleges in Japan

External links
  

Japanese junior colleges
Universities and colleges in Osaka Prefecture